Anthony Molino (born 1957) is a translator, anthropologist, and psychoanalyst.

Life
He has received a Fulbright scholarship to the University of Florence.

His work appeared in Two Lines.

He lives in Philadelphia.

Awards
 1996 Academy of American Poets Raiziss/de Palchi Translation Fellowship
 Fulbright Foundation
 American Academy in Rome
 Pennsylvania Council on the Arts grant
 National Theater Translation Fund grant

Works

Translations

Poetry
 
 Valerio Magrelli (2000). The Contagion of Matter. Holmes & Meier.
 
 
 Kisses from Another Dream. (1987).

Stories

Plays

Editor

References

External links
 

1957 births
Living people
University of Florence alumni
Italian–English translators
American psychoanalysts
Place of birth missing (living people)
Nationality missing
20th-century American translators
21st-century American translators